Robert McGarvey may refer to:

 Robert N. McGarvey (1888-1952), American politician
 Robert V. McGarvey (1888-1952), American National Champion racehorse trainer